Prince of Dongping may refer to:

Cao Hui (Prince of Dongping) (died 242), Cao Wei prince
Zhu Wen (852–912), known as Prince of Dongping during the late Tang dynasty